The S9 service of the S-Bahn Rhein-Main system bearing the KBS (German scheduled railway route) number 645.9. It is largely concurrent with the S8 service, diverging only to bypass Mainz (which the S8 serves locally).

Routes

Taunus Railway

Main Railway

City tunnel 

The city tunnel is an underground, pure S-Bahn route used by almost all services (except for the S7 service which terminates at the central station). In a short section between Mühlberg and Offenbach-Kaiserlei a line parallel with the South Main railway is used.

South Main S-Bahn

History 
This service was first introduced in 2000 to provide an alternative route to Wiesbaden via Frankfurt Airport skipping Rhineland-Palatinate and its capital Mainz.

Operation 
 Wiesbaden Hbf – Hanau Hbf
 Wiesbaden Hbf – Frankfurt Hbf
 Wiesbaden Hbf – Offenbach Ost (sundays only)
 Flughafen Regionalbahnhof – Frankfurt Hbf (former S15 service)
 Flughafen Regionalbahnhof – Offenbach Ost (sundays only)

References

External links 

 traffiQ Frankfurt – S8/S9 timetable

Rhine-Main S-Bahn